1st Kraków Grenadier Regiment (Polish: 1 Regiment Grenadierów Krakowskich) was a scythemen regiment of the insurrection army during the Kościuszko Uprising in 1794.

History 
Both 1st and 2nd regiments were formed in 1794 after battle of Racławice out of all the remaining scythemen who stayed with the insurrect army after the battle. Soldiers of the regiments wore rogatywka peaked caps, navy blue jackets with green revers and czechczery or white broadcloth-made trousers. The units were equipped with 300 rifles and never reached the planned number of soldiers or unitary look of the uniforms.

Commanders 
 Colonel Jan Krzycki
 Lieutenant colonel Euzebiusz Siemianowski

References

Bibliography 
 Rodowody pułków polskich i oddziałów równorzędnych od r. 1717 do r. 1831 by Bronisław Gembarzewski, published by Towarzystwo Wiedzy Wojskowej, Warsaw, 1925 (Polish)
 Wojsko Polskie Kościuszki w roku 1794, Bolesław Twardowski, published by Księgarnia Katolicka, Poznań, 1894 (Polish)

Kraków Grenadier regiments